Esteban Buján (born July 13, 1979) is an Argentine footballer.

References
 Guardian Football

1979 births
Living people
Argentine footballers
Club Atlético Independiente footballers
Club Atlético Banfield footballers
PAS Giannina F.C. players
Albacete Balompié players
Expatriate footballers in Greece
Ferro Carril Oeste footballers
Association football midfielders